Bob Nicholson may refer to:

Bob Nicholson (ice hockey) (born 1953), Canadian ice hockey player and administrator
Bob Nicholson (rugby league) (died after 1950), English rugby league player
Bob Nicholson (sports executive) (born 1955), Canadian football and baseball administrator
Bobby Nicholson 1918–1993, American musician and actor

See also
 Bob Nicholas, American politician
 Robert Nicholson (disambiguation)